Asa Fitch (November 10, 1765August 24, 1843) was a U.S. representative from New York from 1811 to 1813.

He was born in Groton in the Connecticut Colony. He studied medicine and became a physician practicing in Duanesburg and Salem, New York.

During the Revolutionary War he served as a sergeant in Captain Livingston's company. He was a justice of the peace from 1799 to 1810, was President of the Washington County Medical Society from 1806 to 1826, and was a County judge from 1810 to 1821.

He was elected as a Federalist to the Twelfth United States Congress, holding office from March 4, 1811, to March 3, 1813. He declined to be a candidate for renomination in 1812 and resumed the practice of medicine.

He died in Salem, New York, on August 24, 1843, and is interred in Evergreen Cemetery.

References

1765 births
1843 deaths
People from Groton, Connecticut
People from Salem, New York
New York (state) state court judges
Federalist Party members of the United States House of Representatives from New York (state)
People from Duanesburg, New York